Evolutionary biology is the subfield of biology that studies the evolutionary processes (natural selection, common descent, speciation) that produced the diversity of life on Earth. It is also defined as the study of the history of life forms on Earth. Evolution holds that all species are related and gradually change over generations. In a population, the genetic variations affect the phenotypes (physical characteristics) of an organism. These changes in the phenotypes will be an advantage to some organisms, which will then be passed onto their offspring. Some examples of evolution in species over many generations are the peppered moth and flightless birds. In the 1930s, the discipline of evolutionary biology emerged through what Julian Huxley called the modern synthesis of understanding, from previously unrelated fields of biological research, such as genetics and ecology, systematics, and paleontology.

The investigational range of current research has widened to encompass the genetic architecture of adaptation, molecular evolution, and the different forces that contribute to evolution, such as sexual selection, genetic drift, and biogeography. Moreover, the newer field of evolutionary developmental biology ("evo-devo") investigates how embryogenesis is controlled, thus yielding a wider synthesis that integrates developmental biology with the fields of study covered by the earlier evolutionary synthesis.

Subfields

Evolution is the central unifying concept in biology. Biology can be divided into various ways. One way is by the level of biological organization, from molecular to cell, organism to population. Another way is by perceived taxonomic group, with fields such as zoology, botany, and microbiology, reflecting what was once seen as the major divisions of life.
A third way is by approaches, such as field biology, theoretical biology, experimental evolution, and paleontology. These alternative ways of dividing up the subject have been combined with evolutionary biology to create subfields like evolutionary ecology and evolutionary developmental biology.

More recently, the merge between biological science and applied sciences gave birth to new fields that are extensions of evolutionary biology, including evolutionary robotics, engineering, algorithms, economics, and architecture. The basic mechanisms of evolution are applied directly or indirectly to come up with novel designs or solve problems that are difficult to solve otherwise. The research generated in these applied fields, contribute towards progress, especially from work on evolution in computer science and engineering fields such as mechanical engineering.

Different types of evolution

Adaptive evolution 
Adaptive evolution relates to evolutionary changes that happen due to the changes in the environment, this makes the organism suitable to its habitat. This change increases the chances of survival and reproduction of the organism (this can be referred to as an organism's fitness). For example, Darwin's Finches on Galapagos island developed different shaped beaks in order to survive for a long time. Adaptive evolution can also be convergent evolution if two distantly related species live in similar environments facing similar pressures.

Convergent evolution 
Convergent evolution is the process in which related or distantly related organisms evolve similar characteristics independently. This type of evolution creates analogous structures which have a similar function, structure, or form between the two species. For example, sharks and dolphins look alike but they are not related. Likewise, birds, flying insects, and bats all have the ability to fly, but they are not related to each other. These similar traits tend to evolve from having similar environmental pressures.

Divergent evolution 
Divergent evolution is the process of speciation. This can happen in several ways:

 Allopatric speciation is when species are separated by a physical barrier that separates the population into two groups. evolutionary mechanisms such as genetic drift and natural selection can then act independently on each population.

 Peripatric speciation is a type of allopatric speciation that occurs when one of the new populations is considerably smaller than the other initial population. This leads to the founder's effect and the population can have different allele frequencies and phenotypes than the original population. These small populations are also more likely to see effects from genetic drift.

 Parapatric speciation is allopatric speciation but occurs when the species diverge without a physical barrier separating the population. This tends to occur when a population of a species is incredibly large and occupies a vast environment.

 Sympatric speciation is when a new species or subspecies sprouts from the original population while still occupying the same small environment, and without any physical barriers separating them from members of their original population. There is scientific debate as to whether sympatric speciation actually exists.

 Artificial speciation is when scientists purposefully cause new species to emerge to use in laboratory procedures.

Coevolution 
The influence of two closely associated species is known as coevolution. When two or more species evolve in company with each other, one species adapts to changes in other species. This type of evolution often happens in species that have symbiotic relationships. For example, predator-prey coevolution, this is the most common type of co-evolution. In this, the predator must evolve to become a more effective hunter because there is a selective pressure on the prey to steer clear of capture. The prey in turn need to develop better survival strategies. The Red Queen hypothesis is an example of predator-prey interations. The relationship between pollinating insects like bees and flowering plants, herbivores and plants, are also some common examples of diffuse or guild coevolution.

Mechanism: The process of evolution 

The mechanisms of evolution focus mainly on mutation, genetic drift, gene flow, non-random mating, and natural selection.

Mutation: Mutation is a change in the DNA sequence inside a gene or a chromosome of an organism. Most mutations are deleterious, or neutral; i.e. they can neither harm nor benefit, but can also be beneficial sometimes.

Genetic drift: Genetic drift is a variational process, it happens as a result of the sampling errors from one generation to another generation where a random event that happens by chance in nature changes or influences allele frequency within a population. It has a much stronger effect on small populations than large ones.

Gene flow: Gene flow is the transfer of genetic material from the gene pool of one population to another. In a population, migration occurs from one species to another, resulting in the change of allele frequency.

Natural selection: The survival and reproductive rate of a species depends on the adaptability of the species to their environment. This process is called natural selection. Some species with certain traits in a population have higher survival and reproductive rate than others (fitness), and they pass on these genetic features to their offsprings.

Evolutionary developmental biology

In evolutionary developmental biology scientists look at how the different processes in development play a role in how a specific organism reaches its current body plan. The genetic regulation of ontogeny and the phylogenetic process is what allows for this kind of understanding of biology to be possible. By looking at different processes during development, and going through the evolutionary tree, one can determine at which point a specific structure came about. For example, the three germ layers can be observed to not be present in cnidarians and ctenophores, which instead present in worms, being more or less developed depending on the kind of worm itself. Other structures like the development of Hox genes and sensory organs such as eyes can also be traced with this practice.

Phylogenic Trees 

Phylogenic Trees are representations of genetic lineage. They are figures that show how related species are to one another. They formed by analyzing the physical traits as well as the similarities of the DNA between species. Then by using a molecular clock scientists can estimate when the species diverged. An example of a phylogeny would be the tree of life.

Homologs 
Genes that have shared ancestry are homologs. If a speciation event occurs and one gene ends up in two different species the genes are now orthologous. If a gene is duplicated within the a singular species then it is a paralog. A molecular clock can be used to estimate when these events occurred.

History 

The idea of evolution by natural selection was proposed by Charles Darwin in 1859, but evolutionary biology, as an academic discipline in its own right, emerged during the period of the modern synthesis in the 1930s and 1940s. It was not until the 1980s that many universities had departments of evolutionary biology. In the United States, many universities have created departments of molecular and cell biology or ecology and evolutionary biology, in place of the older departments of botany and zoology. Palaeontology is often grouped with earth science.

Microbiology too is becoming an evolutionary discipline now that microbial physiology and genomics are better understood. The quick generation time of bacteria and viruses such as bacteriophages makes it possible to explore evolutionary questions.

Many biologists have contributed to shaping the modern discipline of evolutionary biology. Theodosius Dobzhansky and E. B. Ford established an empirical research programme. Ronald Fisher, Sewall Wright, and J. B. S. Haldane created a sound theoretical framework. Ernst Mayr in systematics, George Gaylord Simpson in paleontology and G. Ledyard Stebbins in botany helped to form the modern synthesis.
James Crow, Richard Lewontin, Dan Hartl, Marcus Feldman, and Brian Charlesworth trained a generation of evolutionary biologists.

Current research topics 
Current research in evolutionary biology covers diverse topics and incorporates ideas from diverse areas, such as molecular genetics and computer science.

First, some fields of evolutionary research try to explain phenomena that were poorly accounted for in the modern evolutionary synthesis. These include speciation, the evolution of sexual reproduction, the evolution of cooperation, the evolution of ageing, and evolvability.

Second, some evolutionary biologists ask the most straightforward evolutionary question: "what happened and when?".  This includes fields such as paleobiology, where paleobiologists and evolutionary biologists, including Thomas Halliday and Anjali Goswami, studied the evolution of early mammals going far back in time during the Mesozoic and Cenozoic eras (between 299 million to 12,000 years ago). Other fields related to generic exploration of evolution ("what happened and when?" ) include systematics and phylogenetics.

Third, the modern evolutionary synthesis was devised at a time when nobody understood the molecular basis of genes. Today, evolutionary biologists try to determine the genetic architecture of interesting evolutionary phenomena such as adaptation and speciation. They seek answers to questions such as how many genes are involved, how large are the effects of each gene, how interdependent are the effects of different genes, what do the genes do, and what changes happen to them (e.g., point mutations vs. gene duplication or even genome duplication). They try to reconcile the high heritability seen in twin studies with the difficulty in finding which genes are responsible for this heritability using genome-wide association studies.

One challenge in studying genetic architecture is that the classical population genetics that catalysed the modern evolutionary synthesis must be updated to take into account modern molecular knowledge. This requires a great deal of mathematical development to relate DNA sequence data to evolutionary theory as part of a theory of molecular evolution. For example, biologists try to infer which genes have been under strong selection by detecting selective sweeps.

Fourth, the modern evolutionary synthesis involved agreement about which forces contribute to evolution, but not about their relative importance. Current research seeks to determine this. Evolutionary forces include natural selection, sexual selection, genetic drift, genetic draft, developmental constraints, mutation bias and biogeography.

This evolutionary approach is key to much current research in organismal biology and ecology, such as life history theory. Annotation of genes and their function relies heavily on comparative approaches. The field of evolutionary developmental biology ("evo-devo") investigates how developmental processes work, and compares them in different organisms to determine how they evolved.

Many physicians do not have enough background in evolutionary biology, making it difficult to use it in modern medicine. However, there are efforts to gain a deeper understanding of disease through evolutionary medicine and to develop evolutionary therapies.

Drug resistance today 
Evolution plays a role in resistance of drugs; for example, how HIV becomes resistant to medications and the body's immune system. The mutation of resistance of HIV is due to the natural selection of the survivors and their offspring. The few HIV that survive the immune system reproduced and had offspring that were also resistant to the immune system.  Drug resistance also causes many problems for patients such as a worsening sickness or the sickness can mutate into something that can no longer be cured with medication. Without the proper medicine, a sickness can be the death of a patient. If their body has resistance to a certain number of drugs, then the right medicine will be harder and harder to find. Not completing the prescribed full course of antibiotic is also an example of resistance that will cause the bacteria against which the antibiotic is being taken to evolve and continue to spread in the body. When the full dosage of the medication does not enter the body and perform its proper job, the bacteria that survive the initial dosage will continue to reproduce. This can make for another bout of sickness later on that will be more difficult to cure because the bacteria involved will be resistant to the first medication used. Taking the full course of medicine that is prescribed is a vital step in avoiding antibiotic resistance.

Individuals with chronic illnesses, especially those that can recur throughout a lifetime, are at greater risk of antibiotic resistance than others. This is because overuse of a drug or too high of a dosage can cause a patient's immune system to weaken and the illness will evolve and grow stronger. For example, cancer patients will need a stronger and stronger dosage of medication because of their low functioning immune system.

Journals
Some scientific journals specialise exclusively in evolutionary biology as a whole, including the journals Evolution, Journal of Evolutionary Biology, and BMC Evolutionary Biology. Some journals cover sub-specialties within evolutionary biology, such as the journals Systematic Biology, Molecular Biology and Evolution and its sister journal Genome Biology and Evolution, and Cladistics.

Other journals combine aspects of evolutionary biology with other related fields. For example, Molecular Ecology, Proceedings of the Royal Society of London Series B, The American Naturalist and Theoretical Population Biology have overlap with ecology and other aspects of organismal biology. Overlap with ecology is also prominent in the review journals Trends in Ecology and Evolution and Annual Review of Ecology, Evolution, and Systematics. The journals Genetics and PLoS Genetics overlap with molecular genetics questions that are not obviously evolutionary in nature.

See also 

 Comparative anatomy 
 Computational phylogenetics
 Evolutionary computation
 Evolutionary dynamics
 Evolutionary neuroscience
 Evolutionary physiology
 
 On the Origin of Species
 Macroevolution
 Phylogenetic comparative methods
 Quantitative genetics
 Selective breeding
 Taxonomy (biology)
 Speculative evolution

References

External links
 
 Evolution and Paleobotany at the Encyclopædia Britannica

 
Philosophy of biology